Pentagonica is a genus of ground beetles in the family Carabidae. There are more than 170 described species in Pentagonica.

Species
These 176 species belong to the genus Pentagonica:

 Pentagonica abyssinica Basilewsky, 1953
 Pentagonica africana Gestro, 1895
 Pentagonica andrewesi Baehr, 2011
 Pentagonica angulipennis Baehr, 2011
 Pentagonica angulosa Bates, 1883
 Pentagonica angustior Baehr, 2011
 Pentagonica antennata Barker, 1919
 Pentagonica apicalis Baehr, 2011
 Pentagonica apiceincisa Baehr, 2011
 Pentagonica atkinsoni Fauvel, 1882
 Pentagonica atrata Baehr, 2011
 Pentagonica atricornis Baehr, 2011
 Pentagonica atripes Baehr, 2011
 Pentagonica atrorufa (Reiche, 1842)
 Pentagonica avicapitis Baehr, 2011
 Pentagonica baliensis Baehr, 2014
 Pentagonica batantae Baehr, 2011
 Pentagonica batesi Andrewes, 1923
 Pentagonica biak Baehr, 2011
 Pentagonica biangulata Dupuis, 1912
 Pentagonica bicolor (LeConte, 1863)
 Pentagonica bifasciata Chaudoir, 1877
 Pentagonica bilyi Baehr, 2011
 Pentagonica bipartita Burgeon, 1937
 Pentagonica blanda Andrewes, 1929
 Pentagonica boavistensis A.Serrano, 1995
 Pentagonica boettcheri Jedlicka, 1935
 Pentagonica brandti Baehr, 2011
 Pentagonica canaliculata Baehr, 2011
 Pentagonica capicola Basilewsky, 1958
 Pentagonica castanea Baehr, 2011
 Pentagonica cechovskyi Baehr, 2019
 Pentagonica celebensis Baehr, 2011
 Pentagonica ceylonica Baehr, 2011
 Pentagonica cognata Baehr, 2011
 Pentagonica communis Baehr, 2011
 Pentagonica comorica Jeannel, 1949
 Pentagonica conradti Kolbe, 1897
 Pentagonica convexipennis Baehr, 2011
 Pentagonica cuspidata Baehr, 2011
 Pentagonica cyanea (Montrouzier, 1860)
 Pentagonica cyanipennis Liebke, 1939
 Pentagonica daimiella Bates, 1892
 Pentagonica darlingtoni Baehr, 2011
 Pentagonica debeauxi Straneo, 1943
 Pentagonica decellei Basilewsky, 1968
 Pentagonica dichroa Sloane, 1903
 Pentagonica discoidea Baehr, 2011
 Pentagonica dispar Péringuey, 1904
 Pentagonica distinguenda Baehr, 2011
 Pentagonica drescheri Louwerens, 1952
 Pentagonica elegans Péringuey, 1896
 Pentagonica erichsoni Schmidt-Goebel, 1846
 Pentagonica estriata Darlington, 1968
 Pentagonica eurodes Andrewes, 1938
 Pentagonica excisis Baehr, 2011
 Pentagonica fakfak Baehr, 2011
 Pentagonica felix R.T.Bell, 1987
 Pentagonica fijiana Baehr, 2011
 Pentagonica flavicornis Baehr, 2011
 Pentagonica flavipes (LeConte, 1853)
 Pentagonica fukiensis Baehr, 2011
 Pentagonica garainae Baehr, 2011
 Pentagonica giluwe Baehr, 2011
 Pentagonica glabripennis Baehr, 2011
 Pentagonica goniodera (Gemminger & Harold, 1868)
 Pentagonica gonostigma Bates, 1883
 Pentagonica gressitti Baehr, 2011
 Pentagonica grimmi Baehr, 2011
 Pentagonica halmaherae Baehr, 2011
 Pentagonica hebridarum Baehr, 2011
 Pentagonica hexagona (Wollaston, 1867)
 Pentagonica horni Dupuis, 1913
 Pentagonica infans Baehr, 2011
 Pentagonica insularum Baehr, 2011
 Pentagonica irsac Basilewsky, 1954
 Pentagonica jakli Baehr, 2011
 Pentagonica javana Baehr, 2011
 Pentagonica kietae Baehr, 2011
 Pentagonica kitchingi Baehr, 2011
 Pentagonica kivuana Basilewsky, 1953
 Pentagonica kundelunguensis Basilewsky, 1953
 Pentagonica kyushuensis Habu, 1967
 Pentagonica laevissima Baehr, 2011
 Pentagonica laticollis Baehr, 2011
 Pentagonica longicornis Baehr, 2011
 Pentagonica lucens Baehr, 2011
 Pentagonica luzoensis Jedlicka, 1934
 Pentagonica macrops Baehr, 2011
 Pentagonica maculicornis Bates, 1883
 Pentagonica malickyi Baehr, 2011
 Pentagonica marshalli Mateu, 1995
 Pentagonica mascarenica Vinson, 1955
 Pentagonica media Liebke, 1939
 Pentagonica melancholica Reichardt, 1970
 Pentagonica micans Andrewes, 1947
 Pentagonica minuta Baehr, 2014
 Pentagonica montana Basilewsky, 1962
 Pentagonica nepalensis Baehr, 2011
 Pentagonica nigerrima Basilewsky, 1954
 Pentagonica nigricornis Darlington, 1934
 Pentagonica nigrifemur Baehr, 2011
 Pentagonica nigripennis Bates, 1873
 Pentagonica nigritula Straneo, 1943
 Pentagonica nigroantennata Baehr, 2013
 Pentagonica nitens Andrewes, 1937
 Pentagonica nitidicollis Baehr, 2011
 Pentagonica novaeguineae Baehr, 2011
 Pentagonica novairlandica Baehr, 2014
 Pentagonica obscura Chaudoir, 1877
 Pentagonica obscuripes Baehr, 2011
 Pentagonica ochracea Reichardt, 1968
 Pentagonica olivacea Chaudoir, 1877
 Pentagonica omostigma Bates, 1883
 Pentagonica oneili Barker, 1919
 Pentagonica orbitalis Baehr, 2011
 Pentagonica palawanica Baehr, 2013
 Pentagonica pallipes (Nietner, 1856)
 Pentagonica papua Darlington, 1968
 Pentagonica parapapua Baehr, 2011
 Pentagonica parviceps Baehr, 2011
 Pentagonica perrieri Fairmaire, 1899
 Pentagonica philipi R.T.Bell, 1985
 Pentagonica philippinensis Jedlicka, 1934
 Pentagonica piceomarginata Baehr, 2011
 Pentagonica picticornis Bates, 1883
 Pentagonica plaumanni Liebke, 1939
 Pentagonica polita Baehr, 2014
 Pentagonica profemorata Baehr, 2011
 Pentagonica proxima Baehr, 2011
 Pentagonica pseudonitens Baehr, 2011
 Pentagonica quadratipennis Louwerens, 1956
 Pentagonica queenslandica Baehr, 2011
 Pentagonica reticulata Baehr, 2014
 Pentagonica riedeli Baehr, 2011
 Pentagonica roedingeri Liebke, 1951
 Pentagonica rubra Baehr, 2011
 Pentagonica rufa Basilewsky, 1948
 Pentagonica ruficeps Baehr, 2011
 Pentagonica ruficollis Schmidt-Goebel, 1846
 Pentagonica rufonigra Baehr, 2013
 Pentagonica rufopicea Baehr, 2011
 Pentagonica rufovirgata Baehr, 2011
 Pentagonica sarawakensis Baehr, 2011
 Pentagonica schachti Baehr, 2011
 Pentagonica scutellaris Chaudoir, 1877
 Pentagonica semilaevis Baehr, 2011
 Pentagonica semisuturalis Dupuis, 1912
 Pentagonica seyrigi Alluaud, 1935
 Pentagonica similis Baehr, 2011
 Pentagonica sinuaticollis Baehr, 2011
 Pentagonica skalei Baehr, 2011
 Pentagonica soror Baehr, 2011
 Pentagonica spatulata Baehr, 2011
 Pentagonica strandi Liebke, 1939
 Pentagonica subcordicollis Bates, 1873
 Pentagonica sumatrensis Baehr, 2011
 Pentagonica suturalis (Schaum, 1863)
 Pentagonica szetschuana Jedlicka, 1934
 Pentagonica taiwanensis Baehr, 2011
 Pentagonica tekadu Baehr, 2011
 Pentagonica tolgae Baehr, 2011
 Pentagonica transgrediens Baehr, 2011
 Pentagonica trimaculata Chaudoir, 1877
 Pentagonica trivittata (Dejean, 1831)
 Pentagonica trukensis Darlington, 1970
 Pentagonica vadoni Jeannel, 1949
 Pentagonica varicornis Heller, 1916
 Pentagonica venusta Andrewes, 1933
 Pentagonica vicina Baehr, 2011
 Pentagonica vietnami Kirschenhofer, 1994
 Pentagonica vittipennis Chaudoir, 1877
 Pentagonica vittula Darlington, 1939
 Pentagonica vixreticulata Baehr, 2011
 Pentagonica wallaceensis Baehr, 2011
 Pentagonica weigeli Baehr, 2011

References

External links

 

Lebiinae